Ian Dalziel (born 1947) is a Scottish politician and former member of the European Parliament.

Ian Dalziel may also refer to:
Ian Dalziel (footballer) (born 1962), an English former footballer for Hereford United and Carlisle United
Ian Dalziel (geologist) (born 1937), a Scottish geologist

See also
Dalziel